Luis Francisco Rodríguez Zegada (born August 22, 1994 in Bolivia) is a Bolivian footballer who plays as a left back.

In his career Rodriguez Zegada has played for three clubs in the Liga de Fútbol Profesional Boliviano. These clubs include Wilstermann, Aurora and his current club Bolívar.

References

External links
 

1994 births
Living people
Bolivian footballers
C.D. Jorge Wilstermann players
Club Aurora players
Club Bolívar players
Oriente Petrolero players
The Strongest players
Club Always Ready players
Bolivian Primera División players
Association football defenders